Chlorida costata is a species of beetle in the family Cerambycidae. It was described by Audinet-Serville in 1834. It is known from southeastern Brazil, Paraguay, Argentina, and Uruguay.

References

Bothriospilini
Beetles described in 1834
Taxa named by Jean Guillaume Audinet-Serville